JinkoSolar Holding Co., Ltd. is a solar panel manufacturer headquartered in Shanghai, China. The company started out as a wafer manufacturer in 2006 and went public on the New York Stock Exchange in 2010. JinkoSolar distributes its solar products and sells to a utility, commercial and residential customers in multiple countries.

JinkoSolar is a member of the Silicon Module Super League. The four other original members of the group are Canadian Solar, Hanwha Q CELLS, JA Solar, and Trina Solar.

In 2021, the U.S. Customs and Border Protection began blocking the import of JinkoSolar products into the United States due to concerns about the use of forced Uyghur labor.

References

External links 

 

Solar energy companies of China
Photovoltaics manufacturers
Manufacturing companies based in Shanghai
Manufacturing companies established in 2006
Renewable resource companies established in 2006
Chinese companies established in 2006
Companies listed on the New York Stock Exchange
2010 initial public offerings